Airship Management Services, Inc. (AMS) builds, owns and operates Airship Industries Skyship and Sentinel type airships.  AMS, run by George Spyrou, and through associated companies in the U.S., Europe and Japan, provides technical and operational support to airships worldwide. AMS is part of the Skycruiser Group of companies, which includes Skycruiser Corporation and Global Skyship Industries (formerly Westinghouse Airship Industries), and owns/operates a fleet of Skyships in America and Europe.

Background
AMS is a private company founded in 1990, based in Greenwich, Connecticut, with a maintenance facility and FAA Repair Station in Elizabeth City, North Carolina.  AMS personnel, many of whom were previously with Westinghouse and Airship Industries, have been providing flight crew, technical expertise and ground support to airships since 1980, and have operated airships in Japan, Korea, Australia, Canada, the United Kingdom, United States, Europe, Argentina, the Dominican Republic and other parts of the Caribbean.

The AMS' clients in the United States have included Ameriquest, the New York City Police Department and Fujifilm (USA) Inc., which has been using a Skyship 600 type airship in the US since 1984, starting with the Los Angeles Summer Olympics.  A Sky-ship was also used over the Olympic Games in Seoul, Korea in 1988 and the Atlanta Olympics in 1996.  In addition, AMS provided two Sky-ships for use over the Athens Olympics in 2004, one for use by Science Applications International Corporation (SAIC) and the Hellenic Police in Greece, and the other for broadcasting by NBC TV.

Since 1980, fifteen Sky-ships have been designed, built, and operated around the world for such customers as Japan Airlines, the Korean Sports Foundation, Fuji film, the Tokyo Police, Citibank, the French Ministry of the Interior, and Pepsi-Cola.  In addition, “Sky-cruises” (passenger tours) have been successfully operated over London, Paris, Munich, Sydney, Melbourne, Switzerland and San Francisco.

A Sky-ship was used for a tour across Europe during 2006, from London to Paris to Rome to Athens, promoting The Palm Islands project in Dubai, United Arab Emirates

During September and October 2007, AMS placed an unbranded Sky-ship over New York, based out of Floyd Bennett Field in Brooklyn, and flew various VIPs and friends and colleagues.

Roles
Airships have been used not only as advertising and promotional vehicles and for the carriage of passengers, but also as television camera platforms, broadcast relay stations and as surveillance vehicles from which various sensors can be operated.  AMS has developed these applications with numerous clients, including Westinghouse, Northrop Grumman, the U.S. Navy, Defense Advanced Research Projects Agency (DARPA), the U.S. Army, the British Ministry of Defence, the NYPD's Counterterrorism Division (for security surveillance), and Woods Hole Oceanographic Institution (WHOI) for environmental surveys. 

During the 2008 GOP Presidential Primary, AMS operated the Ron Paul Blimp.

One Sky-ship, Santos-Dumont (named for Alberto Santos-Dumont), used to operate in the Caribbean for the Special Anti-Crime Unit of Trinidad & Tobago (SAUTT) providing security surveillance.  During April 2009, this ship provided aerial surveillance over the 5th Summit of the Americas in Port-of-Spain.

Notes

External links 
Skycruiser Group

Companies established in 1980
Aircraft manufacturers of the United States
Companies based in Greenwich, Connecticut